FOI or Foi may refer to:

Organisations
 Family Opera Initiative, an American opera company
 Fellowship of Isis, an international spiritual organization
 Forum Oratori Italiani, a Catholic youth organization
 Fruit of Islam,  paramilitary wing of the Nation of Islam
 Swedish Defence Research Agency (Swedish:  (FOI))

Other uses
 Foi language, spoken in Papua New Guinea
 Freedom of information
 Saint Faith (Foy or sometimes Foi), a third-century French saint
 Foi, a village in Crăciunești, Romania

See also 
 Foy (disambiguation)
 FOIA (disambiguation)
 Sainte-Foi, a place in France